Francesco Leonardi may refer to:
 
 Francesco Leonardi (missionary) (died 1646), Italian missionary
 Francesco Leonardi (chef), 18th-century Italian chef and food writer